Jason Suttle is a former defensive back in the National Football League. He played two seasons with the Denver Broncos before being a member of the San Francisco 49ers during his final season.

References

Players of American football from Minneapolis
Denver Broncos players
San Francisco 49ers players
American football defensive backs
Wisconsin Badgers football players
1974 births
Living people